Raymond Lam (Jyutping: lam4 fung1; born 8 December 1979) is a Hong Kong actor and singer who is best known for roles in the television dramas A Step into the Past, Twin of Brothers, Moonlight Resonance, Highs and Lows and Line Walker and was dubbed the King of Chok after his role in The Mysteries of Love.

Early years
Raymond Lam was born in Xiamen, China, on 8 December 1979, but moved to Hong Kong at the age of 2. His father, Lam Kwok-Wah (林國華), is a real-estate property developer in the mainland referred to as "Xiamen's Li Ka-shing" (廈門李嘉誠) who sits on the board of seven real estate and construction companies.

While his first languages are Cantonese and Hokkien, Lam studied in Kiangsu and Chekiang Primary School, a primarily Mandarin-speaking primary school in pre-Handover Hong Kong and is thus also fluent in Mandarin and English. Raymond Lam's childhood dream was to become a professional singer and dancer. He studied in St. Paul's College, Hong Kong for Secondary School. Following that, he studied architecture in Xiamen University for 1st Year, and then completed the rest at University of Southern California, majoring in architecture and minoring in music.

Career

Success in Hong Kong
Lam attended the 13th TVB artists training class in 1998 as an auditing student and was offered a contract with TVB upon graduation in September 1998. In the earlier part of his career, Lam appeared as a walk-on in numerous television series and as a host for TVB8.

Lam rose to fame for his portrayal of the ruthless Qin Shi Huang in the historical/science fiction drama A Step into the Past (2001). He was then offered his first lead role in Eternal Happiness (2002). In 2003, Lam won the TVB Anniversary Award for "Most Improved Male Artiste" for his performance in the legal drama, Survivor's Law. 

In 2004, Lam gained fame in China for his role as Kou Chong in Twin of Brothers, and won several awards. 

After a one-year hiatus in 2005 due to inner conflicts in TVB, Lam made his comeback in La Femme Desperado (2006), which became the highest rated drama of the year. 

In 2007, Lam was cast in The Drive of Life, a grand production by TVB to commemorate the 10th anniversary of Hong Kong reunification.

The following year, Lam returned to star in the Moonlight Resonance, the sequel to Heart of Greed. The series was met with critical acclaim, and subsequently became the highest rated Hong Kong drama since 1991. 

Also in 2008, Lam starred in the wuxia drama The Four. His portrayal of the character "Wu Qing" was met with critical acclaim from fans of the original novel by Woon Swee Oan. This was followed by a starring role in the martial arts series The Master of Tai Chi, for which he won "Best Actor" at the Asian Television Awards. 

In 2010, Lam starred in The Mysteries of Love, where he portrayed a genius physics professor. Lam's portrayal of a professor was described by audience using the slang word "Chok", which means "cool or handsome, to the point of electrifying". Lam stated that he thinks the word means "professional/serious" instead. Subsequently, the term went viral and Lam was named as the "King of Chok".
The same year, Lam also made his foray into films, starring in Perfect Wedding with Miriam Yeung and The Jade and the Pearl with Charlene Choi.

Breaking into China
In 2011, Lam starred in the Chinese film The Sorcerer and the White Snake, portraying Xu Xian. The film was one of the top 5 grossing Chinese films of the year, and Lam was ranked on Forbes China Celebrity List for the first time. 

In 2012, Lam played a policeman for the first time in Highs and Lows. High and Lows was the most watched Hong Kong drama in China that year, and Lam won "Best Actor" at the Huading Awards. The same year, Lam starred in the comedy film, Love Is...Pyjamas. The same year, he took on the role of Zhuge Liang in the time-travel historical drama, Three Kingdoms RPG. 

In 2013, Lam starred in Saving General Yang, portraying the fifth son Yang Yande. He also headlined the horror film, Baby Blues. On the small screen, he starred in historical drama, Loved in the Purple. 

In 2014, he portrayed Han Wudi in the drama The Virtuous Queen of Han, which won him the "Top 10 Most Popular Actor" award at the 9th Chinese TV Audience Festival. He also starred in the hit Hong Kong drama, Line Walker (使徒行者). His character Sit Ka-keung "Bao Seed" was praised by critics for being the "soul/essence" of the drama. His onscreen partnership with Charmaine Sheh was also favoured by viewers. He became a stronger contender for "Best Actor" award in 2014 TVB Anniversary Awards. Lam won the "Best Actor" award at the 15th Huading Awards for his performance in both dramas.

In 2015, Lam portrayed Lu Xiaofeng in the wuxia drama, Detectives and Doctors. He is the fourth Chinese actor to portray the character, and was praised by critics for being the most outstanding Lu Xiaofeng. 

In 2016, Lam starred in the wuxia drama, Six Doors, acting as a constable detective. In 2017, Lam starred in the palace drama, Rule The World, playing Huang Taiji.

In 2018, Lam is set to star in The Legends of Monkey King, playing the titular Sun Wukong. He was also cast in the police procedural drama, Police Tactical Unit.

In 2021, Lam starred as the main lead in Female-centered business drama, Star of Ocean.

Return to TVB

In 2018, Lam signed with Louis Koo’s (古天樂) management agency Sky High Entertainment. 

In 2019, Raymond Lam announced he would be working with TVB and The Voice Entertainment Group (星夢娛樂) during the press conference of TVB Homecoming on 17 March 2019. 

In 2020, Lam reprised his role as "Bao Seed" Sit Ka-keung in Line Walker: Bull Fight (使徒行者3).

Music
Apart from his acting career, Lam also performed some of the theme songs for the television series he acted in. In 2007, Lam signed on with EEG under its Music Plus Label, and released his debut album, Finding Love in Memories, on 23 November. The title track of the album served as one of the theme songs for TVB's The Drive of Life. 

On September 10, 2008, Lam released his second album Your Love. The album secured a double IFPI Platinum Award. A song from the album, Love With No Regrets, became the theme song of Moonlight Resonance, and won many awards including the Gold Song award at the Top Ten Chinese Gold Songs Award and Jade Solid Gold Awards Presentation.

In 2009, Lam released his third album Let's Get Wet and stepped on the Hong Kong Coliseum for his first concert, held on 17 and 18 June. 

On July 17, 2010, Lam released his fourth album Come 2 Me. 

On March 4, 2011, Lam released his first Mandarin album First. On July 22, 2011, Lam released his sixth album LF, which includes the hit single "CHOK". 
The same year, Lam held his third concert, Light Up My Live, which was also his first world tour. 

In 2012, Lam continued his Light up my Live World Tour at other countries such as Macau and several cities in America. 
On August 17, 2012, Lam released his seventh album Self-Portrait. 

On 26 January 2013, Lam held his fourth concert and world tour, A Time 4 You, with his eighth album of the same name released one day before the concert. 

In 2016, Lam released his ninth album, Trap. From 29 April until 1 May 2016, Lam held his fifth concert, Heart Attack LF Live In HK.

Lam left EEG in 2017 after contract expired. 

Lam has signed with TVB’s record label, Voice Entertainment on March 17,2019. Also, in 2020 will be Lam’s 20th debut anniversary, and he plans on doing a concert tour to commemorate it 

On May 20, 2021, Weibo Starlight Awards 2020 ceremony was held online. The winners were all over the world, including Lam, Louis Koo, Takuya Kimura and his two daughters, Katy Perry, Taylor Swift, etc.

In 2021, Lam has signed with Warner Music.

In 2022, Lam joined the cast of reality tv show Call Me by Fire (season 2) as a contestant.

Personal life
Lam married Carina Zhang, a Chinese model, in December 2019.  They had a daughter in September 2020.

Filmography

Film

Television series

Variety show

Discography

Albums

Soundtracks

Awards

Acting awards

TVB Anniversary Awards

TVB Star Awards Malaysia

StarHub TVB Awards

Huading Awards

"Next" Magazine TV Awards

Music awards

Jade Solid Gold Top 10 Awards

RTHK Top 10 Gold Songs Awards

IFPI Hong Kong Top Sales Music Award

Global Chinese Music Awards

China Music Awards

9+2 Music Pioneer Awards

References

External links
 
Raymond Lam's Official Facebook
 Raymond Lam's Official Weibo
 Raymond Lam's Official Instagram

1979 births
20th-century Hong Kong male actors
21st-century Hong Kong male actors
Living people
Cantopop singers
Hong Kong male film actors
Hong Kong male singers
Hong Kong male television actors
Male actors from Fujian
People from Xiamen
TVB veteran actors
Chinese male film actors
Chinese male television actors
20th-century Chinese male actors
21st-century Chinese male actors
Hong Kong idols
Warner Music Hong Kong artists